Juan Pablo de Miguel Bravo (born 28 September 1978), commonly known as Juanpa, is a Spanish retired footballer who played as a right back.

Football career
Juanpa was born in Salamanca, Region of León. During his career, spent mainly at local UD Salamanca and in Segunda División, he also represented CD Numancia (2004–05, his only La Liga experience), Lorca Deportiva CF, UD Las Palmas and Real Oviedo; he made his debut in the Spanish top flight on 19 September 2004, coming on as a 66th-minute substitute in a 1–0 home win against Getafe CF.

Juanpa retired at the end of the 2011–12 season, where he competed with Oviedo in Segunda División B. He amassed second level totals of 288 matches and five goals, over one full decade.

References

External links

1978 births
Living people
Sportspeople from Salamanca
Spanish footballers
Footballers from Castile and León
Association football defenders
La Liga players
Segunda División players
Segunda División B players
UD Salamanca players
CD Numancia players
Lorca Deportiva CF footballers
UD Las Palmas players
Real Oviedo players